Joseph Frank Nemechek III (born September 26, 1963) is an American professional stock car racing driver who last competed part-time in the NASCAR Xfinity Series, driving the No. 24 Toyota Supra for Sam Hunt Racing. Nemechek has made the second most national series starts in NASCAR history. He claimed the record in 2019 after he passed seven-time Cup Series champion Richard Petty, but was surpassed by Kevin Harvick in 2021. Nemechek won the 1992 NASCAR Busch Series championship.

He is the older brother of the late John Nemechek, who died in a crash in the Truck Series race at Homestead-Miami Speedway in 1997. He is the father of John Hunter Nemechek, who competes full-time in the Xfinity Series for Joe Gibbs Racing.

He is nicknamed "Front-Row Joe," which was coined by former teammate Wally Dallenbach for his tendency in the late 1990s to be a regular contender for a front-row starting position.

Racing career

Early career and Busch Series
Nemechek began racing at the age of 13 in motocross and won 300 career races over the next six years. After winning various awards in different short-track series around the country, Nemechek made his Busch Series debut at North Carolina Speedway in 1989, where he started 40th and finished 33rd after suffering an engine failure in his No. 88 Buick.

Nemechek moved up to the Busch Series in 1990, running the No. 87 with sponsorship from Master Machine & Tool, posting two top-fives and finishing 17th in points, winning Rookie of the Year honors. He had 16 top-ten finishes and finished sixth in points the following year. In 1992, Nemechek got full-time sponsorship from Texas Pete sauce, and got his first two career wins and defeated Bobby Labonte for the championship by three points. He did not win again in 1993, but he won three poles and finished fifth in points. That season, he made his Winston Cup debut at New Hampshire International Speedway for his NEMCO team, starting 15th before finishing 36th after suffering rocker arm failure. After running two more races in the 87, he ran a pair of races for Morgan-McClure Motorsports, his best finish 23rd at Rockingham.

Early Cup career

In 1994, Nemechek joined Larry Hedrick Motorsports to drive the No. 41 Meineke Discount Mufflers-sponsored Chevy. Despite missing two races, he had three Top 10 finishes and finished 27th in the points standings. The next season, he moved his No. 87 team up to the Cup series with sponsorship from Burger King, and posted a fourth-place finish at the MBNA 500 and finished 28th in points. After he dropped to 34th in points, he abandoned his Cup series team and signed to drive the No. 42 Bellsouth-sponsored car for SABCO Racing. After losing his brother John in an accident at Homestead-Miami Speedway early in the year, Nemechek won the first two pole positions of his career, at California Speedway and Pocono Raceway, respectively. He posted four Top 10's and finished a career-best 26th in points the following year. Midway through 1999, he announced he would not return to the No. 42 team the following season when he picked up his first career victory at Loudon. He won two more poles at Martinsville and Talladega Superspeedway and finished 30th in points that year.

Andy Petree Racing and Hendrick Motorsports

For 2000, Nemechek signed to drive the No. 33 Oakwood Homes-sponsored Chevrolet for Andy Petree Racing, winning the pole at Talladega and finishing a career-best 15th in points. He missed five races the following year after suffering an elbow injury at a test at Dover in 2001, then went on to win the Pop Secret Microwave Popcorn 400 at North Carolina Speedway that November.

After Petree's team began to run into financial problems, Nemechek's team was left without a sponsor and he left for Haas-Carter Motorsports to take over the No. 26 Kmart-sponsored Ford Taurus that Jimmy Spencer had left for Chip Ganassi Racing. However, Nemechek went from one financial problem to another, as Kmart filed for bankruptcy early in the 2002 season and stopped sponsoring the Haas-Carter team. This forced Haas-Carter to scale back its operations to one team, and Nemechek was released in favor of keeping Todd Bodine, who was driving the team's other car, in the fold. Nemechek found an opportunity almost immediately, as Johnny Benson Jr., who was the driver of the No. 10 Valvoline-sponsored Pontiac for MBV Motorsports, was injured in a crash the previous race and required a substitute. After driving one race in Benson's car at Richmond, Nemechek was hired by Hendrick Motorsports to replace Jerry Nadeau in the No. 25 UAW/Delphi-sponsored Chevrolet. Nemechek drove the remainder of the season for Hendrick and performed well enough to earn that ride full time the next season, including 2nd place runs at Atlanta and Homestead where in the latter of the two races mentioned, he led the most laps, he lost both races to Kurt Busch however.

In 2003, Nemechek started in the second spot, led the most laps, and won the Pontiac Excitement 400. The race was rain-shortened with seven laps left, and just three minutes under a red flag, NASCAR called the race official. Nemechek, in an indoor victory lane, dedicated his win to Nadeau, who previously suffered a massive crash during a practice run at Richmond, which would end up ending Nadeau's career in motorsports. After the big win, Nemechek posted five other Top 10 finishes but finished 25th in points. It wasn't enough for Nemechek to keep his job at Hendrick, and was announced to be released from his contract at the end of the season in favor of their Busch Series driver, Brian Vickers. The team later ended up releasing Nemechek early to prepare for Vickers' start in the No. 25 in 2004. Nemechek would move to his 2004 team, the No. 01 for MB2 Motorsports, early, as well.

MB2 Motorsports/Ginn Racing

For the 2004 season, Nemechek returned to MB2 Motorsports, taking over the No. 01 U.S. Army-sponsored car. He was again replacing Jerry Nadeau as the driver, although this time it was due to Nadeau suffering a severe injury that would eventually end his racing career. He won two poles late in the season. In October, Nemechek won at Kansas Speedway, beating out Ricky Rudd at the finish line. Nemechek also won the Busch Series race at Kansas the day before, making him the first driver to pull the Busch-Cup double win at the track. The victory by Nemechek and MB2 at Kansas was a very emotional victory and Nemechek would say in a post-race interview that it was the biggest win of his career.

In 2005, Nemechek won a pole at Michigan. The season was highlighted by a feud with Kevin Harvick. After Harvick caused a multi-car crash involving Nemechek during practice for the 2005 Daytona 500, Nemechek and Jimmie Johnson were outspoken about their displeasure with Harvick. Later, Nemechek got into a tussle with Harvick during The Nextel Challenge. Nemechek got turned into Harvick by Tony Stewart and, because of their Daytona feud, Harvick took Nemechek's role in the wreck personally, which ignited a heated post-race conversation that nearly came to blows. Nemechek remarked post-race that, "Kevin thinks he owns this world, and he ain't squat." NASCAR would issue no penalties to either drivers.

At the end of the season, Nemechek fell seven points short of matching his career-best points finish.

MB2 was rebranded as Ginn Racing following Bobby Ginn's purchase of the team in 2006. He moved to Ginn's No. 13 with a  CertainTeed sponsorship after veteran Mark Martin and rookie Regan Smith were tapped to share the No. 01 car. In July 2007, Nemechek was released due to a lack of sponsorship for the No. 13, which was subsequently shut down.

E&M Motorsports and Furniture Row Racing

He signed with E&M Motorsports, and although he failed his first attempt to qualify, at Indy, he made his way into the field for the Michigan race weekend driving the No. 08 Fans On Board-sponsored Dodge. He spent the rest of the season driving for Furniture Row Racing, and signed a three-year contract with FRR to continue to drive in the No. 78 and help expand the team. In April 2008, at Talladega, Nemechek grabbed his 10th career pole driving the No. 78 National Day of Prayer/Furniture Row-sponsored car. It marked Furniture Row Racing's first-ever pole. In October 2008, Nemechek finished 11th at the Talladega race. In November 2008, Furniture Row Racing announced that they were planning on running a limited schedule in 2009 or perhaps not at all in light of the economic situation. The day after this announcement Nemechek was released from his contract, and as a result, he was free to pursue other opportunities for 2009 and beyond.

Start and parking

Shortly thereafter, Nemechek announced that he would be bringing his NEMCO Motorsports team back to full competition in both of NASCAR's top series, Sprint Cup and Nationwide. He would race the No. 87 Chevy in Nationwide and the No. 87 Camry in Cup. Nemechek ran most of the races for both series that season but occasionally had a younger fill in. In the Pepsi 300 at Nashville Superspeedway, Nemechek flipped after contact with several other cars. His car had minor damage, and he was able to drive it back to pit road.

Nemechek raced in 30 Cup races during the 2009 season despite very little funding. He finished just three events and did multiple "start and parks" where a driver starts the race, then parks to conserve parts, tires, etc. and to collect the prize money. On two occasions, he gave up his ride to Scott Speed after his fully funded team failed to qualify for Darlington and Sonoma. He qualified for the 2010 Daytona 500 after missing the race the year before. Nemechek picked up sponsorship from England Stove Works but was involved in an accident on lap 64. Nemechek would go on to compete in 30 more Cup races, with most being "start and parks." That season was highlighted by the 2010 AMP Energy Juice 500, Nemechek led the first lap after starting fourth. He would run the full distance, finishing 27th after suffering a blown tire.

Nemechek brought his No. 87 cars back for 2011 to once again run both major NASCAR series. Nemechek successfully qualified for the Daytona 500 for the second year in a row but was once again involved in an early incident, thus failing to finish again. On June 9 at Texas Motor Speedway, along with Jeff Burton he made his 900th NASCAR start in all top three series. In the Nationwide Series, Nemechek scored his first top five since 2005 with a 3rd-place finish at the Aaron's 312 after being in the position to win with 2 laps to go. In July, Nemechek picked up sponsorship from Extenze and AM FM Energy to run the full race in both series at Daytona International Speedway. He led laps in both races but was taken out in late accidents. Nemechek collected Nationwide Series points for 2011 under NASCAR's policy that a driver may accumulate points for only one series, and finished 14th in the final standings. He ran the No. 87 in both the Sprint Cup and Nationwide Series in 2012, with the Cup ride as a start-and-park to fund the Nationwide team. Nemechek made his 600th career start at Michigan and finished 40th after starting 37th. Nemechek finished 11th in the 2012 Nationwide Series points.

2014
Nemechek's team became Identity Ventures Racing in 2014, and he drove several races in the No. 66 car, which had a limited partnership with Michael Waltrip Racing.

In April 2014, Nemechek announced that he would be driving the No. 86 Deware Racing Group Chevrolet Camaro with sponsorship from Bubba Burger. In the 2014 Aaron's 312, Nemechek was running towards the front during the entire race. With 3 laps remaining, Nemechek was running in the top 10 and finished 6th, his 126th top ten in the Nationwide Series. For the Coke Zero 400, Nemechek entered with the No. 29 RAB Racing Toyota with sponsorship from ToyotaCare, but failed to qualify. Nemechek joined Randy Humphrey Racing for the Oral-B USA 500, qualifying 34th and finishing 37th. He returned to RAB Racing's No. 29 at the 2014 GEICO 500, and initially qualified 24th, putting him in the field for the race. However, his car failed post-race inspection for an improperly sealed oil tank encasement, and he failed to qualify. This became the first season in Nemechek's Cup Series career where he did not race in any of the superspeedway races.

2015–2018

Nemechek's team announced that for the 2015 NASCAR Camping World Truck Series season that his team would be returning to Chevrolet after a three-year tenure with Toyota. Nemechek returned to his own team in the Xfinity and Cup series, running a limited schedule with Chevrolets. Nemechek began the season by failing to qualify for the Xfinity race at Daytona, and withdrawing from the Daytona 500.

The following week at Atlanta, he was announced as the substitute for David Ragan in the No. 34 CSX Ford for Front Row Motorsports. At the time, Ragan was driving for Joe Gibbs Racing in place of the injured Kyle Busch. Nemechek drove the No. 34 car to a 33rd-place finish in what would be his only Cup Series start of the season.

Nemechek made two appearances in 2016, driving his own No. 87 in both Xfinity races at Daytona. Nemechek finished 18th in February and 36th in July after being caught in an early crash while he was running in the top 10.

On January 20, 2017, it was announced that Nemechek would drive the No. 87 truck in the first three races of the season. Nemechek would finish 5th in the season opening race. The next week he would finish 24th at Atlanta. Beginning at Gateway after a 4 race break, Nemechek start and parked the No. 87 until the end of the season, skipping only Eldora and Martinsville where he gave up the ride for Ty Dillon, who brought sponsorship to run the full race. Nemechek's son, John Hunter, would win two consecutive Truck Series races at Gateway and Iowa. Nemechek returned to Xfinity Series and drove the final two races of the season for JD Motorsports, beginning with a start and park at Phoenix in the No. 15 and a full race at Homestead in the No. 01 (ironically his old number in the Cup Series from 2003 to 2006), where he would finished 10th in Stage 1.

In 2018, Nemechek took over as a driver at NEMCO Motorsports after his son John Hunter moved up to the Xfinity Series with Chip Ganassi Racing. He had also been announced as one of the drivers of JD Motorsports' No. 15 car, splitting the ride with other drivers.  It was announced that Matt Mills would drive the 15 full time. Nemechek ran the PowerShares QQQ 300 in the 15, and later returned to the car for the Fitzgerald Glider Kits 300.

2019–present

Nemechek would once again run primarily in the Truck Series for 2019, splitting time between the No. 8 and 87, sharing the trucks with multiple drivers. Nemechek also returned to Xfinity competition, driving the No. 13 for MBM Motorsports, and the No. 17 for Mike Harmon Racing. In September, Nemechek raced in the Monster Energy Cup Series for the first time since 2015, returning to Premium Motorsports (formerly Identity Ventures) in their No. 27 car for the Bojangles' Southern 500 as part of the annual throwback weekend. Nemechek later drove at Las Vegas Motor Speedway for the team in September and said that more races in 2019 or 2020 weren't out of the question. Nemechek and his son John Hunter made motorsports history at ISM Raceway in early November 2019 by being the first father-son duo to race in all three main series in one weekend. On November 15, 2019, Nemechek surpassed Richard Petty as the driver with the most starts in NASCAR's three national series, at 1,186.

In 2020, Nemechek returned to Mike Harmon Racing in the Xfinity Series, driving their renumbered No. 47 car for the season opener at Daytona as well as at Las Vegas and Phoenix. Nemechek was scheduled to drive a third part-time car for Mike Harmon in 2021, but NASCAR's lack of regular qualifying halted those plans. Nemechek attempted the Truck Series opener at Daytona, but lacked speed and missed the field for the second year in a row.

In 2022, Nemechek returned to the Xfinity Series, driving the No. 24 for Sam Hunt Racing, partnering with his son John Hunter, at the Wawa 250. However, he failed to qualify for the race after rain cancelled qualifying.

Motorsports career results

NASCAR
(key) (Bold – Pole position awarded by qualifying time. Italics – Pole position earned by points standings or practice time. * – Most laps led.)

Monster Energy Cup Series

Daytona 500

Xfinity Series

Camping World Truck Series

 Season still in progress 
 Ineligible for series points

References

External links

 
 
 

Living people
1963 births
Sportspeople from Lakeland, Florida
Racing drivers from Florida
NASCAR drivers
NASCAR Xfinity Series champions
NASCAR team owners
American people of Czech descent
American Speed Association drivers
Hendrick Motorsports drivers
ARCA Midwest Tour drivers